The year 2009 is the 8th year in the history of the Maximum Fighting Championship, a mixed martial arts promotion based in Canada. In 2009 Maximum Fighting Championship held 4 events beginning with, MFC 20: Destined for Greatness.

Title fights

Events list

MFC 20: Destined for Greatness

MFC 20: Destined for Greatness was an event held on February 20, 2009 at the River Cree Resort and Casino in Edmonton, Alberta.

Results

MFC 21: Hard Knocks

MFC 21: Hard Knocks was an event held on May 15, 2009 at the River Cree Resort and Casino in Edmonton, Alberta.

Results

MFC 22: Payoff

MFC 22: Payoff was an event held on October 2, 2009 at the River Cree Resort and Casino in Edmonton, Alberta.

Results

MFC 23: Unstoppable

MFC 23: Unstoppable was an event held on December 4, 2009 at the River Cree Resort and Casino in Edmonton, Alberta.

Results

See also 
 Maximum Fighting Championship
 List of Maximum Fighting Championship events

References

Maximum Fighting Championship events
2009 in mixed martial arts
Events in Edmonton